Organon F is a Slovak academic journal of philosophy focusing on analytic philosophy, founded in 1994.

External links 
 

Philosophy journals
Quarterly journals
Analytic philosophy literature
Contemporary philosophical literature